Torellbreen is a glacier in Wedel Jarlsberg Land at Spitsbergen, Svalbard. It forms a front below the mountain Raudfjellet, with a length of about twenty kilometers, and is a merge of the two glaciers Austre Torellbreen and Vestre Torellbreen.  The glacier is named after Swedish scientist Otto Martin Torell.

References

Glaciers of Spitsbergen